Zhang Zixiang (born ) is a Chinese male  track cyclist, and part of the national team. He competed in the team sprint event at the 2009 UCI Track Cycling World Championships.

References

External links
 Profile at cyclingarchives.com

1986 births
Living people
Chinese track cyclists
Chinese male cyclists
Place of birth missing (living people)
21st-century Chinese people